The 1990 NAIA Division II football season, as part of the 1990 college football season in the United States and the 35th season of college football sponsored by the NAIA, was the 21st season of play of the NAIA's lower division for football.

The season was played from August to November 1990 and culminated in the 1990 NAIA Division II Football National Championship, played in Omaha, Nebraska near the campus of Peru State College.

Peru State defeated two-time defending champion Westminster (PA) in the championship game, 17–7, to win their first NAIA national title.

Conference standings

Conference champions

Postseason

‡ Game played at Puyallup, Washington
‡‡ Game played at Omaha, Nebraska

See also
 1990 NCAA Division I-A football season
 1990 NCAA Division I-AA football season
 1990 NCAA Division II football season
 1990 NCAA Division III football season

References

 
NAIA Football National Championship